The Men's 4x100m Medley Relay event at the 2007 Pan American Games took place at the Maria Lenk Aquatic Park in Rio de Janeiro, Brazil, with the final being swum on July 22.

Medalists

Results

Finals

Preliminaries
The heats was held on July 20.

References
For the Record, Swimming World Magazine, September 2007 (p. 48+49)

Medley Relay, Men's